Claire Gardent is a French computer scientist and linguist specializing in natural language processing, including natural language generation and machine translation.

Education and career
Gardent was a linguistics student at the University of Toulouse, graduating in 1986. She went to the UK for graduate study, earning a master's degree in artificial intelligence from the University of Essex in 1987 and a PhD in cognitive science from the University of Edinburgh in 1991. Her doctoral dissertation, Gapping and VP ellipsis in a unification-based grammar, was jointly supervised by Ewan Klein and Robin Cooper.

After ten years as a postdoctoral researcher in the Netherlands and Germany, she joined CNRS and LORIA as a researcher in 2000. She has headed a research group on computational, formal, and field linguistics since 2019.

Books
Gardent is the coauthor of books including:
Techniques d'analyse et de génération pour la langue naturelle (with Karine Baschung, Editions Adosa, 1995)
Deep Learning Approaches to Text Production (with Shashi Narayan, Morgan & Claypool, 2020).

Recognition
In 2022 she won the CNRS Silver Medal.

References

External links
Home page

Year of birth missing (living people)
Living people
French computer scientists
French women computer scientists
Linguists from France
Natural language processing researchers
University of Toulouse alumni
Alumni of the University of Essex
Alumni of the University of Edinburgh